Jack Mullane (13 July 1922 – 21 June 2015) was an Australian rules footballer who played with South Melbourne in the Victorian Football League (VFL).

Prior to playing with South Melbourne, Mullane served in the Australian Army during World War II.

Notes

External links 

1922 births
2015 deaths
Australian rules footballers from Victoria (Australia)
Sydney Swans players
North Geelong Football Club players